Jehosie "Jay" Heard (January 17, 1920 – November 18, 1999) was an American professional baseball player. He pitched two games in Major League Baseball for the  Baltimore Orioles, becoming the franchise's first African American player in Baltimore.

Heard began his pro career in the Negro leagues after serving in the United States Army during World War II. During his career in the Negro leagues, he pitched for the Birmingham Black Barons, Memphis Red Sox, Houston Eagles and New Orleans Eagles.  In 1952, at age 32, he joined the organized minor leagues, winning 20 games for the Victoria Tyees of the Class A Western International League. Promoted the following season to the top level of the minors, the Open Classification Pacific Coast League, Heard won 16 games for the Portland Beavers. The Orioles, newly transplanted to Baltimore as the former St. Louis Browns, purchased Heard's contract that winter.

Heard was a member of the first Baltimore team to play in the American League since . He made two appearances for the 1954 Orioles as a relief pitcher, both times against the Chicago White Sox. In his April 24 debut, he faced four batters and retired all of them. But in his second game, more than a month later on May 28, Heard allowed six hits and five runs, all earned, in two innings.  A grand slam home run by Chicago's light-hitting Cass Michaels was the most damaging blow.

He then returned to the minors, where he pitched at the upper levels through 1957.

See also
 List of Negro league baseball players who played in Major League Baseball

References

External links
 and Seamheads

1920 births
1999 deaths
African-American baseball players
Baltimore Orioles players
Baseball players from Georgia (U.S. state)
Birmingham Black Barons players
Havana Sugar Kings players
Leones del Caracas players
Major League Baseball pitchers
Memphis Red Sox players
Navegantes del Magallanes players
American expatriate baseball players in Venezuela
New Orleans Eagles players
Sportspeople from Athens, Georgia
Portland Beavers players
Seattle Rainiers players
Tulsa Oilers (baseball) players
Victoria Tyees players
United States Army personnel of World War II
20th-century African-American sportspeople
American expatriate baseball players in Cuba
American expatriate baseball players in Colombia
Charleston Senators players